Halls of Anger is a 1970 American drama film directed by Paul Bogart, and starring Calvin Lockhart, Janet MacLachlan, Jeff Bridges and James A. Watson Jr.

Plot
A predominantly black high school is integrated by white students and trouble follows.

Cast
 Calvin Lockhart as Quincy Davis
 Janet MacLachlan as Lorraine Nash
 Jeff Bridges as Doug
 James A. Watson Jr. as J.T. Watson
 DeWayne Jessie as Lerone Johnson
 Ed Asner as Ernie McKay
 John McLiam as Boyd Wilkerson
 Rob Reiner as "Leaky" Couloris
 Patricia Stich as Sherry Vaughn
 Gary Tigerman as Buchavitch
 Paris Earl as Carter (as Paris Earle)
 Ta-Tanisha as Claudine
 Helen Kleeb as Rita Monahan
 Barry Brown as Winger

Background
The film was mostly filmed at Virgil Middle School in Los Angeles.

The film draws some comparisons to a contemporary television program, Room 222:  A new, black teacher joins a southern California high school; an attractive, sympathetic black female member of staff shows romantic interest; a militant black student is frequently involved in situations; issues of racism and integration are featured.  The film and television show even share actors (Ta-Tanisha, Helen Kleeb, Rob Reiner).  However, while Room 222 is a comedy-drama, much milder in tone, Halls of Anger is purposefully aggressive, using deliberately controversial language and some forceful violence to highlight the very real and dangerous potential of unresolved racial conflict.

Reception

Critical response
Roger Greenspun, the film critic for The New York Times, gave the film a mixed review, and wrote, "The picture initially portends sensationalism, with the racial scales reversed and the well-behaved white youngsters harassed and tormented by the black students. What steadies the whole thing is the excellent performance of Calvin Lockhart, as a sane, realistic Negro teacher who more or less holds together the teeming school and the picture itself...But the picture's urgent plea for racial sanity in the classroom is almost methodically blunted by the use of standard-seeming types. The few faculty whites are oafs or hard-heads. There is the pretty Negro teacher, nicely played by Janet MacLachlan, who supports and comforts Lockhart. As the fieriest black student and the spunkiest white newcomer, James A. Watson Jr. and Jeff Bridges do well in characterizations that rate more exploration."

Film critic Monica Sullivan praised the acting of Jeff Bridges, if not the film, "The young Bridges stands out in the cast, because his focus on his role is like a laser beam. He pours 100% of his energy into making his character believable and it is. The making of Halls Of Anger might be a more riveting experience than the film itself."

See also
 List of American films of 1970
 List of hood films

References

External links
 
 
 
 
 

1970 films
1970 drama films
1970s teen films
American drama films
American high school films
1970s English-language films
Films scored by Dave Grusin
Films about educators
Films about race and ethnicity
Films directed by Paul Bogart
Films set in Los Angeles
United Artists films
1970s American films